Ko Sung-hyun (Hangul: 고성현; ; born 21 May 1987) is a South Korean badminton player affiliated with Gimcheon City Hall. He is a former world number 1 both in the men's and mixed doubles. Ko is a BWF World Champion, two time Badminton Asian Champion, and Asian Games gold medalist.

Ko started to get the attention of the World and Korean badminton when he won the bronze medal at the 2010 World Championships partnered with Ha Jung-eun. Competed in the men's doubles with Yoo Yeon-seong, Ko have achieved several milestones, including won the silver medals at the 2009 Asian and 2011 World Championships, reached a career high as world number 2 at the BWF world ranking. Ko and Yoo ended their partnerships after participating in 2012 London Olympics. Ko then topped the men's doubles BWF world ranking partnered with Lee Yong-dae in May 2013. Ko and Lee were a gold medalists at the 2013 Asian Championships and Summer Universiade.

Teamed-up with Shin Baek-cheol, Ko won the gold medal at the 2014 World Championships. Together with Kim Ha-na, Ko clinched the 2013 Asian Championships title and won his first Superseries title in the mixed doubles at the 2014 Australian Open. Ko and Kim participated at the 2016 Rio Olympics, reaching in to the quarter finals stage, and occupied the mixed doubles world number 1 in September 2016.

Achievements

BWF World Championships 
Men's doubles

Mixed doubles

Asian Championships 
Men's doubles

Mixed doubles

Summer Universiade 
Men's doubles

BWF World Tour (7 titles, 3 runners-up) 
The BWF World Tour, which was announced on 19 March 2017 and implemented in 2018, is a series of elite badminton tournaments sanctioned by the Badminton World Federation (BWF). The BWF World Tour is divided into levels of World Tour Finals, Super 1000, Super 750, Super 500, Super 300 (part of the HSBC World Tour), and the BWF Tour Super 100.

Men's doubles

Mixed doubles

BWF Superseries (11 titles, 16 runners-up) 
The BWF Superseries, which was launched on 14 December 2006 and implemented in 2007, was a series of elite badminton tournaments, sanctioned by the Badminton World Federation (BWF). BWF Superseries levels were Superseries and Superseries Premier. A season of Superseries consisted of twelve tournaments around the world that had been introduced since 2011. Successful players were invited to the Superseries Finals, which were held at the end of each year.

Men's doubles

Mixed doubles

  BWF Superseries Finals tournament
  BWF Superseries Premier tournament
  BWF Superseries tournament

BWF Grand Prix (18 titles, 7 runners-up) 
The BWF Grand Prix had two levels, the Grand Prix and Grand Prix Gold. It was a series of badminton tournaments sanctioned by the Badminton World Federation (BWF) and played between 2007 and 2017.

Men's doubles

Mixed doubles

  BWF Grand Prix Gold tournament
  BWF Grand Prix tournament

BWF International Challenge/Series (5 titles, 2 runners-up) 
Men's doubles

Mixed doubles

  BWF International Challenge tournament
  BWF International Series tournament

References

External links 
 
 

1987 births
Living people
People from Goesan County
Sportspeople from North Chungcheong Province
South Korean male badminton players
Badminton players at the 2012 Summer Olympics
Badminton players at the 2016 Summer Olympics
Olympic badminton players of South Korea
Badminton players at the 2010 Asian Games
Badminton players at the 2014 Asian Games
Asian Games gold medalists for South Korea
Asian Games silver medalists for South Korea
Asian Games medalists in badminton
Medalists at the 2010 Asian Games
Medalists at the 2014 Asian Games
Universiade gold medalists for South Korea
Universiade medalists in badminton
Medalists at the 2013 Summer Universiade
Medalists at the 2015 Summer Universiade
World No. 1 badminton players
21st-century South Korean people